Greville Place is a  nature reserve in Kilburn in the London Borough of Camden. It is a Site of Local Importance for Nature Conservation, and it is managed by the London Wildlife Trust.

Habitats include a pond and beehives, and woodland with a mature cooper beech and a black mulberry distorted with age. There are invertebrates such as stag beetles, frogs, toads and newts. Shade-tolerant plants include enchanter's-nightshade, lords-and-ladies and wood avens.

The site at 1a Greville Place is only open on the first Sunday of each month between 11 am and 1 pm.

References

Nature reserves in the London Borough of Camden
London Wildlife Trust